Joseph Jean Pierre Benoit (born March 2, 1939) was mayor of Ottawa from 1972 to 1974. He was a lawyer by career but subsequently pursued a variety of interests.

Benoit studied law at the University of Ottawa and played Canadian football with the Ottawa Gee-Gees from 1957 to 1961. He then practised law in the Ottawa area. He was mayor during the opening of the Main Branch of the Ottawa Public Library in 1974. After his term as mayor, he was a columnist for the Ottawa Journal, a French-language radio host {CJRC} and a political commentator on television {CJOH}, all in Ottawa. He later worked with Campeau Corporation in commercial and residential development. Later he served as an executive with VMS Realty Partners in Chicago, Illinois, following which he embarked on a career as a corporate turnaround specialist and financial advisor.

He unsuccessfully contested an Ontario by-election on 7 November 1974 in the Carleton East provincial electoral district as a Progressive Conservative candidate.

On 18 April 2008, he was inducted into the University of Ottawa Gee-Gees Hall of Fame as a two-way All-Star.

With Campeau Corporation and later with Greystone Investments, he was responsible for major real estate developments in Ottawa, Montreal, Regina, Oshawa and Calgary in Canada as well as in San Francisco, Los Angeles and Orange County, California; Houston, Dallas and Plano, Texas; and in Jupiter, Florida, aggregating more than $1.5 billion in total development costs.

With VMS Realty Partners he was one of the key executives charged with overseeing the restructuring and eventual liquidation of that $9.0 billion enterprise.

As a turnaround specialist and financial advisor he represented the bondholders in the restructuring and bankruptcy of House of Fabrics, a $500 mm + retail chain and served as chairman and chief restructuring officer of Murray Energy, a major coal producer.  He also has represented bondholders and secured creditors as well as several Committees of Unsecured Creditors in a variety of industries

He currently serves on the board Interprise Design, a Dallas-based ESOP.

He resides in Scottsdale, Arizona.

His granddaughter, Amanda Kline, has followed in his footsteps, working as a broadcast journalist for CTV Montreal.

One of his nieces is former CBC radio journalist Avril Benoît.

References

1939 births
Living people
Mayors of Ottawa
Lawyers in Ontario
Ottawa city councillors
University of Ottawa alumni
Ottawa controllers
Franco-Ontarian people